The 2022–23 Stetson Hatters men's basketball team represented Stetson University in the 2022–23 NCAA Division I men's basketball season. The Hatters, led by fourth-year head coach Donnie Jones, played their home games at the Edmunds Center in DeLand, Florida as members of the ASUN Conference. They finished the season 17–13, 12–6 in ASUN play to finish in fourth place. They lost in the quarterfinals of the ASUN tournament to Lipscomb. Stetson received an invitation to play in the CBI, where they lost in overtime to Milwaukee in the first round. The 2022-23 season marked the Hatters' first winning record since the 2000-01 season.

Previous season 
The Hatters finished the 2021–22 season 11–19, 5–11 in ASUN play to finish in last place in the East division. They lost in the first round of the ASUN tournament to Central Arkansas.

Roster

Schedule and results

|-
!colspan=12 style=| Exhibition

|-
!colspan=12 style=| Non-conference regular season

|-
!colspan=12 style=| ASUN regular season

 
|-
!colspan=12 style=| ASUN tournament

|-
!colspan=12 style=| College Basketball Invitational

|-

Source

References

Stetson Hatters men's basketball seasons
Stetson
Stetson
Stetson Hatters men's basketball
Stetson Hatters men's basketball